Kabekona is an unincorporated community in Hendrickson Township, Hubbard County, Minnesota, United States.  The community is also known as Kabekona Corner.

The community is located at the junction of U.S. Highway 71 and State Highway 200 (MN 200).

Kabekona is located west of Laporte, east of Lake George, northwest of Walker, and south of Bemidji.

The Paul Bunyan State Forest is nearby.

References

Unincorporated communities in Hubbard County, Minnesota
Unincorporated communities in Minnesota